Psamathe may refer to:

Greek mythology
 Psamathe (Nereid)
 Psamathe (Crotopus), Daughter of Crotopus

Other
 Psamathe (moon), moon of Neptune
 Psamathe (polychaete), polychaete worm genus
 Psamathe (Leighton), 1880 painting of the Nereid by Frederic Leighton